In a written or published work, an initial capital, also referred to as a drop capital or simply an initial cap, initial, initcapital, initcap or init or a drop cap or drop, is a letter at the beginning of a word, a chapter, or a paragraph that is larger than the rest of the text. The word is derived from the Latin initialis, which means standing at the beginning.  An initial is often several lines in height and in older books or manuscripts are known as "inhabited" initials.  Certain important initials, such as the Beatus initial or "B" of Beatus vir... at the opening of Psalm 1 at the start of a vulgate Latin. These specific initials in an illuminated manuscript were also called initiums.

In the present, the word "initial" commonly refers to the first letter of any word or name, the latter normally capitalized in English usage and is generally that of a first given name or a middle one or ones.

History

The classical tradition was slow to use capital letters for initials at all; in surviving Roman texts it often is difficult even to separate the words as spacing was not used either. In late antiquity (c. 4th–6th century) both came into common use in Italy, the initials usually were set in the left margin (as in the third example below), as though to cut them off from the rest of the text, and about twice as tall as the other letters.  The radical innovation of insular manuscripts was to make initials much larger, not indented, and for the letters immediately following the initial also to be larger, but diminishing in size (called the "diminuendo" effect, after the musical term).  Subsequently, they became larger still, coloured, and penetrated farther and farther into the rest of the text, until the whole page might be taken over.  The decoration of insular initials, especially large ones, was generally abstract and geometrical, or featured animals in patterns. Historiated initials were an Insular invention, but did not come into their own until the later developments of Ottonian art, Anglo-Saxon art, and the Romanesque style in particular.  After this period, in Gothic art large paintings of scenes tended to go in rectangular framed spaces, and the initial, although often still historiated, tended to become smaller again.

In the very early history of printing, the typesetters would leave blank the necessary space, so that the initials could be added later by a scribe or miniature painter.  Later initials were printed using separate blocks in woodcut or metalcut techniques.

Since 2003, the W3C is working for initial letter modules for CSS Inline Layout Module Level 3, which standardized the output of initial letters for web pages.

Types of initial
The initials are morphologically classified: the rubricated letter (red); the epigraphic letter, imitating ancient Roman majuscules; the figurated initial (usually in miniatures); the historiated initial, that gives spatial support to scenes of a narrative character; etc.

The initial may sit on the same baseline as the first line of text, at the same margin, as it does here. This is the easiest to typeset on a computer, including in HTML. An example follows (using Lorem ipsum nonsense text):

Lorem ipsum dolor sit amet, consectetur adipisicing elit, sed do eiusmod tempor incididunt ut labore et dolore magna aliqua. Ut enim ad minim veniam, quis nostrud exercitation ullamco laboris nisi ut aliquip ex ea commodo consequat. Duis aute irure dolor in reprehenderit in voluptate velit esse cillum dolore eu fugiat nulla pariatur. Excepteur sint occaecat cupidatat non proident, sunt in culpa qui officia deserunt mollit anim id est laborum.

Alternatively, the initial may be in the left margin, with the text indented, as shown here. In word processors and HTML, this may be implemented using a table with two cells, one for the initial and one for the rest of the text. The difference between this and a true drop cap may be seen when the text extends below the initial. For example:

With a drop cap, the initial sits within the margins and runs several lines deep into the paragraph, indenting some normal-sized text in these lines. This keeps the left and top margins of the paragraph flush.

In modern computer browsers, this may be achieved with a combination of HTML and CSS by using the float: left; setting. A CSS-only solution alternatively can use the :first-letter pseudo-element. An example of this format is the following paragraph:
Lorem ipsum dolor sit amet, consectetur adipisicing elit, sed do eiusmod tempor incididunt ut labore et dolore magna aliqua. Ut enim ad minim veniam, quis nostrud exercitation ullamco laboris nisi ut aliquip ex ea commodo consequat. Duis aute irure dolor in reprehenderit in voluptate velit esse cillum dolore eu fugiat nulla pariatur. Excepteur sint occaecat cupidatat non proident, sunt in culpa qui officia deserunt mollit anim id est laborum.

In some older manuscripts, the first letter of normal sized text after a drop cap also would be capitalized, as may be seen in the Mainz Psalter above, and in the original 1609 printing of Shakespeare's sonnets. This evoked the handwritten "diminuendo" style of gradually reducing the text size over the course of the first line. This style now is rare, except in newspapers.

See also

References

Further reading
 .

External links

 Typolis.de
 Types of illuminated initials in the Glossary of Medieval Art and Architecture
 Ornamento Ornamento contains close to a quarter of a million ornate letters, ornaments, borders, musical notation, diagrams, and illustrations drawn from Iberian print before 1701.
 Initials and Ornaments by Book Historian on Flickr.com
 Alphabets & Letters at Reusableart.com
 Make the letter bigger: A history of initials at ilovetypography.com

Typography
Book design
Iconography of illuminated manuscripts
Capitalization